Williams County is a county located in the U.S. state of Ohio. As of the 2020 census, the population was 37,102. Its county seat is Bryan. The county was created in 1820 and later organized in 1824. It is named for David Williams, one of the captors of John André in the American Revolutionary War.

Geography

Adjacent counties
 Hillsdale County, Michigan (north)
 Fulton County (east)
 Henry County (southeast)
 Defiance County (south)
 DeKalb County, Indiana (southwest)
 Steuben County, Indiana (northwest)

Demographics

2000 census
As of the census of 2000, there were 39,188 people, 15,105 households, and 10,664 families living in the county. The population density was 93 people per square mile (36/km2). There were 16,140 housing units at an average density of 38 per square mile (15/km2). The racial makeup of the county was 96.51% White, 0.72% Black or African American, 0.23% Native American, 0.52% Asian, 0.01% Pacific Islander, 1.19% from other races, and 0.83% from two or more races. 2.68% of the population were Hispanic or Latino of any race. 43.6% were of German, 17.7% American, 8.1% English and 5.8% Irish ancestry according to Census 2000.

There were 15,105 households, out of which 33.30% had children under the age of 18 living with them, 57.50% were married couples living together, 9.00% had a female householder with no husband present, and 29.40% were non-families. 24.90% of all households were made up of individuals, and 10.50% had someone living alone who was 65 years of age or older. The average household size was 2.52 and the average family size was 3.00.

In the county, the population was spread out, with 26.20% under the age of 18, 8.30% from 18 to 24, 28.70% from 25 to 44, 22.90% from 45 to 64, and 13.90% who were 65 years of age or older. The median age was 37 years. For every 100 females there were 98.70 males. For every 100 females age 18 and over, there were 96.40 males.

The median income for a household in the county was $40,735, and the median income for a family was $47,398. Males had a median income of $33,476 versus $22,136 for females. The per capita income for the county was $18,441. About 3.90% of families and 6.00% of the population were below the poverty line, including 6.20% of those under age 18 and 6.90% of those age 65 or over.

2010 census
As of the 2010 United States Census, there were 37,642 people, 15,075 households, and 10,260 families living in the county. The racial makeup of the county was 95.9% white, 1.0% black or African American, 0.6% Asian, 0.2% American Indian, 1.1% from other races, and 1.2% from two or more races. Those of Hispanic or Latino origin made up 3.7% of the population. In terms of ancestry, 46.1% were German, 12.0% were Irish, 10.7% were English, and 7.8% were American.

Of the 15,075 households, 31.0% had children under the age of 18 living with them, 53.0% were married couples living together, 9.9% had a female householder with no husband present, 31.9% were non-families, and 27.0% of all households were made up of individuals. The average household size was 2.43 and the average family size was 2.93. The median age was 40.7 years.

The median income for a household in the county was $44,538 and the median income for a family was $52,975. Males had a median income of $40,658 versus $29,064 for females. The per capita income for the county was $21,381. About 9.1% of families and 11.8% of the population were below the poverty line, including 17.6% of those under age 18 and 8.6% of those age 65 or over.

Politics
Williams County is a Republican stronghold county in presidential elections. The last Democrat to win the county was Lyndon B. Johnson in 1964.

|}

Government

Williams County has three county commissioners who oversee the various county departments. Current commissioners are:
Brian Davis, Lewis Hilkert, and Terry Rummel.

Communities

City
 Bryan (county seat)

Villages

 Blakeslee
 Edgerton
 Edon
 Holiday City
 Montpelier
 Pioneer
 Stryker
 West Unity

Townships

 Brady
 Bridgewater
 Center
 Florence
 Jefferson
 Madison
 Mill Creek
 Northwest
 Pulaski
 St. Joseph
 Springfield
 Superior

Census-designated places
 Alvordton
 Kunkle
 Lake Seneca
 Nettle Lake
 Pulaski

Unincorporated communities
 Berlin
 Bridgewater Center
 Columbia
 Cooney
 Hamer
 Lock Port
 Melbern
 Mina
 West Jefferson
 Williams Center

See also
 National Register of Historic Places listings in Williams County, Ohio

References

External links
 Williams County Government's website
 https://www.facebook.com/groups/TheWilliamsCountyOhioVirtualMuseum/ The Williams County, Ohio Virtual Museum on Facebook

 
1824 establishments in Ohio
Populated places established in 1824